The  was a Japanese political party which was in existence for a short period in early 1998. It was a centrist, reformist party that merged with other parties in April 1998 to form the Democratic Party of Japan.

There was an earlier pre-war Minseitō party, the Rikken Minseitō which existed from 1927-1940.

History
The Good Governance Party was composed of several smaller reformist groups that had emerged during the collapse of the large coalition New Frontier Party in 1996.
These groups were:
 The , led by Tsutomu Hata, 
 The  led by Michihiko Kano 

Hata, Kano and Hosokawa all played important roles in the development of the DPJ as the largest opposition party in Japan.

Presidents of GGP

References

Centrist parties in Japan
Defunct political parties in Japan
Liberal parties in Japan
Political parties established in 1998
Political parties disestablished in 1998